West Dorset by-election may refer to:

 1895 West Dorset by-election
 1941 West Dorset by-election